Adirindi Alludu is a 1996 Telugu-language film directed by E. V. V. Satyanarayana. The film stars Mohan Babu and Ramya Krishna in the lead roles. The film is a remake of 1988 Tamil film Idhu Namma Aalu.

Plot

Cast
Mohan Babu as Chandram
Ramya Krishnan as Lakshmi
J. V. Somayajulu as Parameswara Sastri, Lakshmi's father 
Brahmanandam
Annapurna as Chandram's mother
Kota Srinivasa Rao as Chandram's father

Soundtrack 
"Andagathera Mundukochera" - M. M. Srilekha, S. P. Balasubrahmanyam
"Adirindi Naku Intalluda" - K. S. Chithra, S. P. Balasubrahmanyam 
"Adivo Alladivo" - K. S. Chithra, S. P. Balasubrahmanyam
"Ade Marade Allade" - S. P. Balasubrahmanyam, K. S. Chithra
"Pelli Gilli Aypoyaka" - Mano, K. S. Chithra
"Muddante Mojupadi" - Mano, Sujatha Mohan

References

External links

1996 films
1990s Telugu-language films
Indian comedy-drama films
Films about the caste system in India
Films directed by E. V. V. Satyanarayana
Films scored by M. M. Keeravani
Telugu remakes of Tamil films
1996 comedy-drama films